Herbert Voldemar Johanson (10 September 1884 in Haljala, Estonia – 24 November 1964 in Gothenburg, Sweden) was an Estonian architect.

His notable works include:
Building of the Parliament of Estonia, Riigikogu in Toompea Castle; 1920 with Eugen Habermann
Ristiku Basic School; 1927–1929
Tallinn School of Service (Tallinna Teeninduskool); 1932–1935
Tallinn French School (Tallinna Prantsuse Lütseum); completed 1937
Chapel in Metsakalmistu; 1936–1937
Fire station in centre of Tallinn; 1936–1939
Central Hospital in Tallinn; 1937–1945
Tallinn Coeducational Gymnasium (Tallinna Ühisgümnaasium); 1938–1940
Jakob Westholm Gymnasium (Jakob Westholmi gümnaasium); 1938–1940

References

External links

1884 births
1964 deaths
People from Haljala Parish
People from the Governorate of Estonia
Modernist architects
Riga Technical University alumni
Estonian World War II refugees
Estonian emigrants to Sweden
20th-century Estonian architects
Burials at Liiva Cemetery